The 2013 American Athletic Conference football season was the 23rd NCAA Division I FBS football season of the American Athletic Conference (The American). The season was the first after the breakup of the former Big East Conference, which lasted in its original form from its creation in 1979 until July 2013. The charter of the former Big East was retained by The American, henceforth the legal status as the 23rd season overall.

UCF as The American's Champion earned the league's last automatic berth for a BCS Bowl Game. Following the 2013 college football season, the BCS (1998–2013) will be replaced by a four team playoff system. Starting in 2014, The American will lose its Automatic Qualifier (AQ) status, and fall into the "Group of Five" with Conference USA, the Mid-American Conference, Mountain West Conference, and the Sun Belt Conference.

In its first year, the conference consisted of 10 football members: Cincinnati, Connecticut, Houston, Louisville, Memphis, Rutgers, SMU, South Florida, Temple, and UCF. Conference members began regular-season play on August 29 when UCF hosted Akron. Conference play started on September 7 when Temple hosted Houston. The regular season concluded on December 7. The following match-ups were not seen in conference play in 2013: Cincinnati–UCF, Connecticut–Houston, Louisville–SMU, Memphis–Rutgers, and South Florida–Temple. Louisville–SMU and Memphis–Rutgers will not be seen in any year in The American play as Louisville and Rutgers are leaving for the ACC and Big Ten, respectively, in 2014.

Previous season
On February 28, 2013, ESPN reported that the conference's seven schools that did not play FBS football, which had announced plans to leave the conference as a bloc no later than July 2015, had reached an agreement to leave in July 2013, and would keep the "Big East" name when they formed a new conference at that time. As a result, the football schools retained the original Big East charter and would operate under a new name in the 2013 football season. The new conference name was officially announced on April 3, 2013.

Cincinnati, Louisville, Rutgers, and Syracuse were co-champions with identical 5–2 records.  Louisville received the Big East BCS bid. As the Big East BCS representative, the Cardinals defeated Florida 33-23 in the 2013 Allstate Sugar Bowl. In other bowl games, Cincinnati defeated Duke 48-34 in the Belk Bowl 48-34 with interim coach Steve Stripling. Rutgers lost to Virginia Tech 13-10 in the Russell Athletic Bowl, while Syracuse in their final game as a Big East member defeated former Big East member West Virginia 38-14 in the Pinstripe Bowl.  In Pittsburgh's final game as a Big East member, the Panthers lost to Ole Miss 38-17 in the BBVA Compass Bowl.

Preseason

Coaching changes
Three teams have new head coaches for the 2013 season. Tommy Tuberville replaces Butch Jones at Cincinnati, Willie Taggart replaces Skip Holtz at South Florida and Matt Rhule has taken over for Steve Addazio at Temple.

Preseason Poll
The 2013 American Athletic Conference Preseason Poll was announced at the 2013 American Athletic Conference Media Day in Newport, Rhode Island on July 30, 2013.

 Louisville (28)
 Cincinnati (2)
 Rutgers
 UCF
 South Florida
 Houston
 UConn
 SMU
 Temple
 Memphis

 (first place votes)

Rankings

Schedule

Week 1

Bye Week: Memphis

Week 2

Bye Week: Connecticut

Week 3

Bye Week: Houston, SMU

Week 4

Bye Week: Temple, South Florida, UCF

Week 5

Bye Week: Cincinnati, Louisville, Memphis, Rutgers

Week 6

Bye Week: Connecticut, Houston

Week 7

Bye Week: SMU, UCF

Week 8

Bye Week: Rutgers, South Florida

Week 9

Bye Week: Cincinnati, Memphis

Week 10

Bye Week: Connecticut, Louisville, SMU, UCF

Week 11

Bye Week: Rutgers, South Florida

Week 12

Week 13

Week 14

Bye Week: Cincinnati, Louisville

Week 15

Bye Week: Temple, Houston

Reference:

Bowl Games

Note: The American Athletic Conference did not have enough bowl eligible teams to send a representative to the Beef 'O' Brady's Bowl.

Bowl Eligibility

Bowl Eligible
Louisville (11-1): Became bowl eligible on October 10 after defeating Rutgers.
Houston (8-4): Became bowl eligible on October 26 after defeating Rutgers.
UCF (11-1): Became bowl eligible on October 26 after defeating Connecticut.
Cincinnati (9-3): Became bowl eligible on October 30 after defeating Memphis.
Rutgers (6-6): Became bowl eligible on December 7 after defeating South Florida.

Bowl Ineligible
Connecticut (3-9): Lost the ability to become bowl eligible on October 26 after losing to UCF.
Temple (2-10): Lost the ability to become bowl eligible on October 26 after losing to SMU.
South Florida (2-10): Lost the ability to become bowl eligible on November 16 after losing to Memphis.
Memphis (3-9): Lost the ability to become bowl eligible on November 23 after losing to Louisville.
SMU (5-7): Lost the ability to become bowl eligible on December 7 after losing to UCF.

Records against other conferences

American vs. BCS conferences

American vs. FBS conferences

Players of the week
Following each week of games, American Athletic Conference officials select the players of the week from the conference's teams.

Position key

Awards and honors

Conference awards
The following individuals received postseason honors as voted by the American Athletic Conference football coaches

Home game attendance 

1 @ Reliant Stadium
2 @ BBVA Compass Field

 UH vs Rice (34,481) a neutral site game does not count towards attendance

References